Samson Semyonovich Kutateladze (– 20 March 1986) was a Soviet heat physicist and hydrodynamist.

Biography

Early life
Kutateladze's parents divorced when he was four, and he was raised by his mother, Aleksandra Vladimirovna, an obstetric nurse. His father, Semyon Samsonovich, had been a nobleman; he was before the October Revolution a student at Petrograd University and then an army officer. He was arrested in 1937 and died in a camp near Novosibirsk. Following the divorce, Kutateladze and his mother lived for a few years in Georgia, returning in 1922 to Petrograd.

Maturity
Hoping to supplement the family's low income, Kutateladze left school to find work on completing the eighth grade at Leningrad's Secondary School 193. His first job was as a fitter apprentice at the Chimgaz plant; shortly afterwards he entered a technical school associated with the Leningrad Regional Heat Engineering Institute, now known as the Polzunov Boiler and Turbine Institute. Kutateladze started his research without higher education and worked in the institute until 1958, rising to the position of full professor and head of a major department. His career was interrupted only by the Great Patriotic War, when Kutateladze served as a marine on the Northern Front. He was wounded in the first days of the Nazi offensive on Murmansk, and carried an irremovable German bullet in his right leg until his death.

In 1958 Kutateladze left his position at the Physical-Technical Department of the Polzunov Institute in 1958 to become Deputy Director of the Thermal Physics Institute in the newly convened Siberian Division of the Academy of Sciences of the Soviet Union. He was a major designer of the Institute of Thermal Physics and its Director from 1964 up to death. In 1994 the institute was renamed, in honor of him, as the Kutateladze Institute of Thermophysics. Kutateladze's son, Semën Samsonovich Kutateladze, is a distinguished Russian mathematician.

Scientific heritage
Samson Kutateladze is renowned for his hydrodynamic theory of the burnout crisis of film boiling and for his theory of relative limit laws of wall turbulence. He propounded the latter in Siberia, together with his student Aleksandr Leontiev, who went on to become a full member of the Russian Academy of Sciences.

Awards and honors
 Order of the Red Banner of Labour (1954)
 Order of the Badge of Honour (1957)
 Three Orders of Lenin (1967, 1982, 1984)
 Max Jakob Memorial Award (1969)
 Order of the October Revolution (1974)
 Polzunov Award of the Academy of Sciences of the Soviet Union (1976)
 Full Member of the Academy of Sciences of the Soviet Union (1979)
 USSR State Prize (1983)
 Hero of Socialist Labour (1984)
 Order of the Patriotic War, 1st class (1985)

Major publications

 S.S. Kutateladze. Fundamentals of Heat Transfer under State Transformations of Matter, Mashgiz Publishers, 1939.
 S.S. Kutateladze and R.V. Tsukerman, Overview of the Development of the Theory of Heat in the Works of Russian Scientists in the 18th and 19th Centuries, State Energy Publishers, 1949.
 S.S. Kutateladze and R.V. Tsukerman, Overview of the Research of Russian Scientists and Engineers in the Area of Boiler Technology, State Energy Publishers, 1951.
 S.S. Kutateladze, Heat Transfer in Condensation and Boiling, United States Atomic Commission, 1952.
 S.S. Kutateladze et al., Liquid-Metal Heat Transfer Media, Consultans Bureau Inc. and Chapman & Hall, 1959.
 S.S. Kutateladze, Fundamentals of Heat Transfer, Academic Press and Arnold, 1963.
 S.S. Kutateladze and V.M. Borishanskii, A Concise Encyclopedia of Heat Transfer, Pergamon Press, 1966.
 S.S. Kutateladze and A.I. Leontiev, Turbulent Boundary Layers in Compressible Gases, Academic Press and Arnold, 1964 (translated and exquisitely commented by D.B. Spalding).
 S.S, Kutateladze, Near-Wall Turbulence, Nauka Publishers, 1973.
 S.S. Kutateladze and M.A. Styrikovich, Hydrodynamics of Gas-Liquid Systems, Energy Publishers, 1976.
 S.S. Kutateladze and V.E. Nakoryakov, Heat and Mass Transfer and Waves in Gas-Liquid Systems, Nauka Publishers, 1984.
 S.S. Kutateladze, Similarity Analysis and Physical Models, Nauka Publishers, 1986.
 S.S. Kutateladze and A.I. Leontiev, Heat Transfer, Mass Transfer, and Friction in Turbulent Boundary Layers, Hemisphere Publishing Corporation, 1989.

External links
 S.S. Kutateladze—Winner of the Max Jacob International Award, Journal of Engineering Physics and Thermophysics 20, no. 5 (1971), 693—694
 Samson Semyonovich Kutateladze (on his 60th birthday),  Journal of Engineering Physics and Thermophysics27, no. 3 (1974), 1160—1162
 N.N. Suntsov, S.S. Kutateladze in the A.N. Krylov Naval Academy of Ship Building and Armaments, International Journal of Fluid Mechanics Research 27 (2000), 517—518
International Journal of Fluid Mechanics Research, 2000, 27, no. 5-6 (Special Issue Devoted to Academician Samson Semyonovich Kutateladze).
 A.I. Leontiev, The Unforgettable Samson Semyonovich Kutateladze, Thermophysics and Aeromechanics, 2007, 14, no. 1, 13-20.
The Kutateladze Institute of Thermophysics
Biobibliographic Data
The Siberian Heat Physicist

1914 births
1986 deaths
20th-century Russian physicists
Scientists from Novosibirsk
Academic staff of Novosibirsk State University
Peter the Great St. Petersburg Polytechnic University alumni
Communist Party of the Soviet Union members
Full Members of the USSR Academy of Sciences
Heroes of Socialist Labour
Recipients of the Order of Lenin
Recipients of the Order of the Red Banner of Labour
Recipients of the USSR State Prize
Russian physicists
Soviet physicists
Burials at Yuzhnoye Cemetery (Novosibirsk)